The 1905 Bolnai earthquake occurred in or near the Asgat Sum of Zavkhan Province in Mongolia on 23 July. The earthquake has been estimated at 8.25 to 8.4 on the moment magnitude scale.

Background

The Bolnai earthquake is believed to be a strike-slip rupture of a branch of the Bolnai Fault, extending about 300 to 375 km along the fault, and possibly an additional 80 km of the Teregtiin Fault. The fault displacement during the earthquake was greater than 6 m, and possibly as much as 11 m, and the duration is estimated at about two minutes.

The Bolnai earthquake was preceded by the Tsetserleg earthquake two weeks earlier and is considered a part of the same general crustal movement.

Damage

There are few records of the immediate effects of the earthquake due to the remoteness of Mongolia in 1905. However, rockslides were reported in the nearby mountains, and supposedly "two lakes, each of eight acres in size, disappeared".

Popular Culture

Lasting damage of the earthquake can be seen in the Mongolia special of the Amazon Prime motoring show The Grand Tour.

See also
 List of earthquakes in 1905

References

External links 

1905 earthquakes
Earthquakes in Mongolia 
Earthquakes in China 
July 1905 events
20th century in Mongolia
1905 in China
1905 disasters in China  
1905 disasters in Mongolia 
1905 disasters in Asia